Nicolaes Willingh (1640, The Hague – 1678, Berlin), was a Dutch Golden Age painter.

Biography

According to Houbraken he was the teacher of Robbert Duval and Augustinus Terwesten. According to Jan van Gool, who was curious about Houbraken's "teacher of Robbert Duval and Augustinus Terwesten", he was born in the Hague and made a name for himself working for the "Grave van Hoorn" (Count of Hoorn).
He died in Berlin in 1678.

According to the RKD he was the brother-in-law of Anthony de Haen, father of Pieter Willingh, and member of the Confrerie Pictura in the Hague. He became court painter to Frederick William, Elector of Brandenburg in 1667, and his pupils were Robbert Duval, Louis Michiel, and Augustinus Terwesten I. He is known for landscapes and historical allegories.

Gallery

References

1640 births
1678 deaths
Dutch Golden Age painters
Dutch male painters
Artists from The Hague
Court painters
Painters from The Hague